Some of the Tamil language writers.

 A. Dakshinamurthy
 A. Muttulingam
 Aravindan Neelakandan
 Brammarajan
 Ambai
 Charu Nivedita
 Cho Dharman
 Dhamayanthi
 Devan
 Era Natarasan
 Imayam
 Indira Parthasarathy
 Indira Soundarajan
 Jeyamohan
 Joe D'Cruz
 Ki. Rajanarayanan 
 Leena Manimekalai
 M. V. Venkatram
 Maharishi
 Meena Kandasamy
 Nandagopal
 Nanjil Nadan
 Neela Padmanabhan
 Pa. Raghavan
 Perumal Murugan
 Pon Arunachalam
 Ponneelan
 Poomani
 Ramanichandran
 S. Ramakrishnan
 Sa. Kandasamy
 Sivasankari
 Subha
 Thamarai
 Thangam Krishnamurthy
 Vaasanthi
 Vairamuthu
 Vannadhasan
 Vikraman
 Vittal Rao

Dead writers
 Aadhavan
 Anuradha Ramanan
 Asokamithran
 A. S. Gnanasambandan
 B. S. Ramiah
 Balakumaran
 Bharathidasan
 Dhanushkodi Ramasamy
 Jayakanthan
 Kalki Krishnamurthy
 Ka. Naa. Subramanyam
 Karichan Kunju 
 Ku. Alagirisami
 La Sa Ra
 Lakshmi
 Melanmai Ponnusamy
 Mu. Varadarajan
 Nakulan
 N. Pichamoorthi
 P. Sri Acharya
 Pudhumaipithan
 Rajam Krishnan
 Ra. Ki. Rangarajan
 R. P. Sethu Pillai 
 Sandilyan
 Sujatha
 Sundara Ramaswamy
 Tamilvanan
 Thi. Janakiraman
 Thi. Ka. Sivasankaran
 Vallikannan
 Vembu Vikiraman

Tamil

Tamil